Cachoeira (Portuguese meaning waterfall) may refer to several places in Brazil:

populated places:
Cachoeira, a city in Bahia state
Cachoeira Alta, Goiás
Cachoeira do Arari, Pará
Cachoeira do Campo, Minas Gerais
Cachoeira Dourada, Goiás, Goiás
Cachoeira Dourada, Minas Gerais, Minas Gerais
Cachoeira de Goiás, Goiás
Cachoeira Grande, Maranhão
Cachoeira dos Índios, Paraíba
Cachoeira de Minas, Minas Gerais
Cachoeira de Pajeú, Minas Gerais
Cachoeira Paulista, São Paulo
Cachoeira do Piriá, Pará
Cachoeira da Prata, Minas Gerais
Cachoeira do Sul, Rio Grande do Sul
Cachoeiras de Macacu, Rio de Janeiro
Cachoeirinha, a neighborhood of Belo Horizonte
Carmo da Cachoeira, Minas Gerais
Nova Cachoeirinha, a neighborhood of Belo Horizonte
São Gabriel da Cachoeira, Amazonas
Três Cachoe, Rio Grande do Sul
rivers:
Cachoeira River (disambiguation), several rivers

See also

Cachoeiras (disambiguation)
Cachoeirinha